Tony Johnson may refer to:

Tony Johnson (American football coach), college football coach
Tony Johnson (Australian politician) (1924–2001), member of the New South Wales Legislative Assembly, 1973–1983
Tony Johnson (basketball) (born 1991), American basketball player
Tony Johnson (baseball) (born 1956), former Major League Baseball left fielder and designated hitter
Tony Johnson (rower) (born 1940), American rower
Tony Johnson (soccer) (born 1961), retired American soccer forward
Tony Johnson (tight end) (born 1972), American football tight end
Tony Johnson (wide receiver) (born 1982), American football wide receiver
Tony Johnson (sound engineer), American sound engineer
Tony Johnson (broadcaster) (born 1959), New Zealand rugby commentator and presenter
Anthony "White Tony" Johnson (1969–1991), gang leader of the Cheetham Hillbillies
Tony Johnson (Chinook), chairman of the Chinook Indian Nation
Tony Johnson (fighter) (born 1986), American mixed martial artist

See also
Anthony Johnson (disambiguation)
Tony Johnston (born 1970), Australian television presenter
Tony Johnstone (born 1956), Zimbabwean golfer